Sky Research is an international unexploded ordnance detection company located primarily in the United States. It was established in 1995 by Sky (who uses a single name) and his wife Anne Sky. In October 2011, it was awarded a $9.4 million contract by the U.S. Army Corps of Engineers for the development of the Military Munitions Response Program.

In 2009 Sky Research was recognized as a laureate in the Computerworld Honors program. Sky Research scientists received Project of the Year awards from the Strategic Environmental Research and Development Program in 2010 and again in 2011.

Since 2012, Sky Research was investigation related to corruption and bribery of a federal official. The bribery investigation found Sky Research had provided a federal contract officer with vacations, food, alcohol and sexual encounters with attractive female office assistants, whom were explicitly hired for this purpose, in exchange for rigging contracts and signing off on fraudulent expense claims to the government. In 2016 Sky pleaded guilty to conspiracy.

Sky Research also assisted in the location and removal of World War II munitions in Puget Sound.

Sky Research has locations in:
 Ashland, OR
 Boston, MA
 Denver, CO
 Hanover, NH

References

Bomb disposal